Jerome Charles Witte (July 30, 1915 – April 27, 2002) was a professional baseball player. He played parts of two seasons in Major League Baseball, 1946 and 1947, for the St. Louis Browns, primarily as a first baseman. He also had a long minor league baseball career, spanning 16 seasons from 1937 until 1952. In 1946, he won the American Association Most Valuable Player Award while playing for the Toledo Mud Hens, earning a shot at the major leagues that September.

External links

Major League Baseball first basemen
St. Louis Browns players
Mayfield Clothiers players
Terre Haute Tots players
Lafayette White Sox players
Youngstown Browns players
San Antonio Missions players
Toledo Mud Hens players
Louisville Colonels (minor league) players
Dallas Eagles players
Rochester Red Wings players
Houston Buffaloes players
Baseball players from St. Louis
1915 births
2002 deaths
American Association (1902–1997) MVP Award winners